A constitutional referendum was held in United Principalities on –. The proposals were approved by 99.81% of voters.

Background
The Paris Convention remained the governing document following the election of Alexandru Ioan Cuza as Domnitor over the United Principalities (1859). After the referendum, the Paris Convention was replaced by Cuza's own organic law, entitled "Statute expanding the Paris Convention" (Statutul dezvoltător al Convenției de la Paris). The Senate of Romania was created following the referendum, called Corpul Ponderator (Ponderative Body).

Results

References

1864 referendums
1864 in Romania
Referendums in Romania
June 1864 events